Lake Alice is a lake in Hubbard County, in the U.S. state of Minnesota.

Lake Alice was named for Alice Glazier, the daughter of Minnesota explorer Captain Willard W. Glazier.

See also
List of lakes in Minnesota

References

Lakes of Minnesota
Lakes of Hubbard County, Minnesota